Manasseh Nshuti is a Rwandan accountant, businessman, academic and politician. He serves as the Minister of State for East African Community Affairs in the Rwandan Cabinet, effective 1 May 2020. Before that, from 2013 until 2020, he was the Chairman of University of Kigali, a private university in Kigali, the country's capital city.

Early life and education
Nshuti holds a Bachelor of Commerce from Makerere University, in Uganda. His second degree, a Master of Business Administration, in Accounting, was awarded by the University of Aberdeen, in Scotland. He also holds a Doctor of Philosophy degree in Finance, obtained from the University of Aberdeen as well.

Since 2013, Nshuti has served as the Chairman of the University of Kigali, a private university that he helped to found.

Career
Nshuti lectured at Strathmore University in Nairobi, Kenya for fourteen years. Another seven years were spent lecturing and administering at the Catholic University of Eastern Africa, also in Nairobi, Kenya. He also lectured at the University of Aberdeen for two years, while pursuing his doctoral degree.

Political career
Nshuti first served in the Cabinet of Rwanda from 2003 until 2005, as the Minister of Commerce, Industry, Investment Promotion, Tourism and Cooperatives. He was transferred to the Ministry of Finance in 2005, to replace Donald Kaberuka, who was appointed President of the African Development Bank.

In 2006, he was appointed Minister of Public Service and Labor, serving there until 2008, when he was named as Senior Economic Advisor to the President of Rwanda. For a period, between 2008 and 2013, Nshuti served as Chairman of Crystal Ventures Limited, the business arm of the Rwandan military.

In May 2020, he took over the East African Community portfolio, replacing Olivier Nduhungirehe, who was fired from cabinet, on 10 April 2020, for "fronting his personal opinions before government policies..". It is his responsibility to lead efforts to restore normal relations with neighboring Uganda, which have deteriorated of the past two to three years.

References

External links
 Biography of Professor Manasseh Nshuti

Living people
Year of birth missing (living people)
Rwandan accountants
Rwandan politicians
Rwandan businesspeople
Makerere University alumni
Alumni of the University of Aberdeen
Finance ministers of Rwanda
Industry ministers of Rwanda
Labour ministers of Rwanda
Tourism ministers of Rwanda
Trade ministers of Rwanda
Government ministers of Rwanda
Independent politicians in Rwanda
Academic staff of Strathmore University
Academic staff of the Catholic University of Eastern Africa
Academic staff of the University of Kigali